is a pizza restaurant chain in Japan. It has its headquarters in Nakamura-ku, Nagoya, Aichi Prefecture.

John Kricfalusi of Spümcø created an advertisement for Aoki's Pizza, with Jimmy the Idiot Boy and Sody Pop. It has offered a number of promotions, including one in connection with Microsoft Corporation's Xbox.

References

External links

Fast-food chains of Japan
Pizza chains of Japan
Companies based in Nagoya